Piauí Esporte Clube, commonly known as Piauí, are a Brazilian football team from Teresina. They won the Campeonato Piauiense five times and competed in the Série A twice.

History
They were founded on August 15, 1948. The club won the Campeonato Piauiense for the first time in 1966, winning again the competition in the three subsequent years. Piauí competed in the Série A in 1979 and in 1986.

Stadium
They play their home games at the Lindolfinho stadium. The stadium has a maximum capacity of 8,000 people.

Achievements

 Campeonato Piauiense:
 Winners (5): 1966, 1967, 1968, 1969, 1985

References

Association football clubs established in 1948
Football clubs in Piauí
1948 establishments in Brazil